400 Days may refer to:

 400 Days (film), a 2015 film directed by Matt Osterman
 400 Days (novel), a 2021 novel by Chetan Bhagat
 400 Days (video game), DLC content released in 2013 for The Walking Dead

See also
 40 Days